Patrick Ferland (born 12 September 1965) is a Swiss backstroke swimmer. He competed at the 1984 Summer Olympics and the 1988 Summer Olympics.

References

External links
 

1965 births
Living people
Swiss male backstroke swimmers
Olympic swimmers of Switzerland
Swimmers at the 1984 Summer Olympics
Swimmers at the 1988 Summer Olympics
Sportspeople from Lausanne